Bhairav is one of the ten basic thaats of Hindustani music from the Indian subcontinent. It is also the name of a raga within this thaat. But there is no connection in the similarity between in the names of the thaat and the raga.

Description
Ragas of the Bhairav thaat make use of Komal Rishabh and Komal Dhaivat. Bhairava is one of the names of Shiva especially in his powerful form as a naked ascetic with matted locks and body smeared with ashes. The ragas too have some of these masculine and ascetic attributes in its form and compositions.

The Bhairav raga itself is extremely vast and allows a huge number of note combinations and a great range of emotional qualities from valour to peace. There are many variations based on it including (but not restricted to) Ahir Bhairav, Alam Bhairav, Anand Bhairav, Bairagi Bhairav, Beehad Bhairav, Bhavmat Bhairav, Devata Bhairav, Gauri Bhairav, Nat Bhairav, Shivmat Bhairav.

Ragas
Ragas belonging to the Bhairav thaat include:

 Basant Mukhari
 Bhairav Bahar
 Bhairav
 Bibhas
 Ramkali
 Gunkali
 Jogiya
 Zeelaf
 Saurashtra Bhairav
 Bangal Bhairav
 Komal Bhairav
 Mangal Bhairav
 Ahir Bhairav
 Alam Bhairav
 Anand Bhairav, 
 Bairagi Bhairav, 
 Beehad Bhairav
 Kaushi Bhairav
 Bhavmat Bhairav
 Devata Bhairav
 Gauri Bhairav
 Nat Bhairav
 Shivmat Bhairav
 Bhatiyari Bhairav
 Virat Bhairav
 Kabiri Bhairav
 Prabhat Bhairav
 Roopkali
 Bakula Bhairav
 Hussaini Bhairav
 Kalingda
 Devaranjani
 Asa Bhairav
 Jaun Bhairav
 Mand Bhairav

References

2. https://www.parrikar.org/hindustani/bhairav/

Hindustani music theory